Burt Shevelove (September 19, 1915 – April 8, 1982) was an American musical theater playwright, lyricist, librettist, and director.

Biography 
Born in Newark, New Jersey, he graduated from Brown University and Yale (Master's degree). At Brown in 1935, he acted in the first ever Brownbrokers musical titled Something Bruin.  After serving as a volunteer ambulance driver in World War II, he began working as a writer, director and producer for radio and television. At the time of his death he had lived in London for many years.

His Broadway career started in 1948 with writing material, co-producing and directing for the revue Small Wonder.  Among his successes were A Funny Thing Happened on the Way to the Forum and No, No, Nanette, for which he won the Drama Desk Award for Outstanding Book of a Musical.

He died at his apartment in London, where he had been living for about 15 years, on April 8. 1982. He was survived by his mother and a sister.

Work

Libretti
A Funny Thing Happened on the Way to the Forum 1962, revived 1972, 1996
No, No, Nanette revisions made in 1971, from an original libretto by Otto Harbach and Frank Mandel
The Frogs adapted from Aristophanes' play in 1974; in 2004 Nathan Lane further adapted Shevelove's libretto for the work's Broadway premiere
Happy New Year 1980
Jerome Robbins' Broadway 1989; used some of Shevelove's Forum text

Directing
Small Wonder (1948)
Hallelujah, Baby! (1967)
Rockefeller and the Red Indians (1968)
No, No, Nanette (1971)
A Funny Thing Happened on the Way to the Forum (1972)
Sondheim: A Musical Tribute (1973)
June Moon (1974 PBS production)
Rodgers & Hart (1975)
So Long, 174th Street (1976)
Happy New Year (1980)

Lyrics
Small Wonder 1948

References

External links
 
 
Sondheim Guide listing
Sondheim interview

1915 births
1981 deaths
American musical theatre librettists
American male screenwriters
Drama Desk Award winners
Tony Award winners
20th-century American dramatists and playwrights
American male dramatists and playwrights
20th-century American male writers
Screenwriters from New York (state)
20th-century American screenwriters
Brown University alumni
Yale University alumni